Cnemaspis tarutaoensis, the Tarutao rock gecko, is a species of gecko endemic to Thailand.

References

tarutaoensis
Reptiles described in 2019
Fauna of Thailand